The Live Through This Tour was an international concert tour by the American alternative rock band Hole, spanning late 1994 through 1995, in support of their second studio album, Live Through This. The tour included dates in 14 countries and was widely documented in the media due to frontwoman Courtney Love's raucous stage behavior throughout, which divided critics. 

Initially planned to begin in the early summer of 1994, the tour was postponed after the death of the band's bassist, Kristen Pfaff, on June 16 that year. In August, the band hired Canadian bassist Melissa Auf der Maur, and commenced the tour, with their first date being the 1994 Reading Festival. The tour was also highly anticipated as it marked Love's first public performance since the suicide of her husband, Kurt Cobain, in April. During the first week of the band's North American dates, Hole opened for Nine Inch Nails (who were simultaneously on the Self Destruct Tour) before proceeding as a headlining act. Supporting acts included Madder Rose, the Melvins, and Veruca Salt.

The tour was subject of a series of legal troubles for Love as well, involving physical altercations between herself, crowd members, and other musicians. In addition to Love receiving death threats at some performances, she was arrested twice during the tour, and pleaded guilty to punching Kathleen Hanna at a Lollapalooza date. She was also unsuccessfully sued by two male concertgoers who alleged she struck them during a performance in Florida in March 1995.

Overview
Days before the release of Hole's second album, Live Through This, frontwoman Courtney Love's husband, Nirvana frontman Kurt Cobain, committed suicide in their Seattle home. The Live Through This Tour was slated to begin in the summer of 1994, but was temporarily halted after the death of the band's bassist, Kristen Pfaff, of a heroin overdose.

On August 19, 1994—one week before the band's scheduled debut performance at the Reading Festival—the group hired Melissa Auf der Maur, a Canadian bassist from Montreal. The first week of the tour after the Reading Festival had Hole as a supporting act for Nine Inch Nails before they embarked as a headliner for the following concerts. In 1995, the band made appearances at several Big Day Out festival dates, and went on to join Lollapalooza in North America, performing with the traveling festival throughout the summer of 1995 alongside Sonic Youth and Cypress Hill.

Reception

Critical response to the Live Through This Tour varied, with some local critics lambasting Love's performances. Reviewing their opening performance of the tour at the 1994 Reading Festival, critic John Peel wrote that Love's disheveled appearance "would have drawn whistles of astonishment in Bedlam," and that her performance "verged on the heroic ... Love steered her band through a set which dared you to pity either her recent history or that of the band ... the band teetered on the edge of chaos, generating a tension which I cannot remember having felt before from any stage." New York Times critic Jon Pareles gave a favorable review of the band's fall 1994 concert in New York City, describing the music as "fierce, exploding from restrained verses to vehement choruses."

Reviewing a September 26, 1994 performance in Asbury Park, New Jersey, Eric Deggans lambasted the band, writing that "Love's seeming disinterest in relating to the crowd or delivering a show ultimately sabotaged what could have been a legendary experience...  Love and her musicians charged through the songs with an urgency that suited their angry, disillusioned message." Journalist Natasha Kassulke, reviewing an October 1994 performance in Madison, Wisconsin, criticized Love's behavior during the concert, writing that "Ninety minutes was all it took to reduce Courtney Love, the angry bleached-blonde singer...  into a half-naked, modern day Ophelia."

Jon Casmir, reviewing a January 1995 date in Sydney, Australia, similarly found Love's onstage antics offensive, noting that she "picked up one of the plastic baby dolls strewn around the stage, mimed giving birth, then threw it straight into the audience," though he conceded that "in all likelihood, this was one of those shows which will burn into myth, the subject of reminiscence and folklore for a long time to come." Casmir concluded that "For someone who wants to avoid the circus that surrounds the Cobain mythology, [Love] went out of her way to give the gawkers a freak show."

Love's tendency to ramble between songs was noted by numerous reviewers. Drummer Patty Schemel recalled: "It was hard [for Courtney] to continually try to push those feelings down. Certain things would remind her [of Kurt], and a lot of times onstage it would come out."

In a retrospective, VH1 referred to the tour as "a series of emotionally-charged shows that were part therapy, part eulogy, and completely legendary."

Legal and safety troubles
At the band's October 1994 appearance at the WFNX Birthday Bash event in Boston, the radio station received an anonymous call from a person threatening to shoot Love to death onstage during the event. Prior to the concert's commencement, a man was ejected from the club after a gun was found in his possession.

The tour went on to garner significant media attention, largely related to a series of subsequent legal troubles involving Love; in January 1995, en route to Melbourne to commence the band's Australian tour dates, she was arrested for disrupting a Qantas Airways flight after getting into an argument with a stewardess. Six months later, on July 4, 1995 at a Lollapalooza date in George, Washington, Love punched Bikini Kill singer Kathleen Hanna in the face after alleging she had made a joke about her daughter. She pleaded guilty to an assault charge and was sentenced to anger management classes. On July 31, Love walked offstage in the middle of a set after someone threw shotgun shells at her during the band's Lollapalooza performance near Pittsburgh, suggestive of her husband, Cobain's, suicide.

Further media attention came in November 1995 when two male teenagers attempted to sue Love for allegedly punching them during a concert they attended in Orlando, Florida in March 1995. The judge ultimately dismissed the case on grounds that the teens "weren't exposed to any greater amount of violence than could reasonably be expected at an alternative rock concert." Commenting on her legal troubles and performances during this period, Love stated that she was abusing Rohypnol at the time, and could not recall much of the tour.

Other acts 
Supporting
 Veruca Salt
 Melvins
 Wool
 Milk Money
 Helium
 Marilyn Manson
 Madder Rose
 Miranda Sex Garden

Supported
 Nine Inch Nails

Tour dates

Notes

References

Sources
 

1994 concert tours
1995 concert tours
Hole (band) concert tours